A list of animated television series that first aired in 1973.

See also
 List of animated feature films of 1973
 List of Japanese animation television series of 1973

References

Television series
Animated series
1973
1973
1973-related lists